H. arenaria  may refer to:
 Hemicycliophora arenaria, a plant pathogenic nematode species
 Heterodera arenaria, a plant pathogenic nematode species

See also
 Arenaria (disambiguation)